Oleg Gubin (born April 12, 1981) is a Russian professional ice hockey forward who is currently playing for Khimik Voskresensk in the Supreme Hockey League (VHL). He previously played for Amur Khabarovsk of the Kontinental Hockey League (KHL).

References

External links

1981 births
Living people
Amur Khabarovsk players
Avtomobilist Yekaterinburg players
HC Khimik Voskresensk players
HC Neftekhimik Nizhnekamsk players
Russian ice hockey centres
Severstal Cherepovets players
HC Sibir Novosibirsk players
HC Spartak Moscow players
People from Voskresensk
Sportspeople from Moscow Oblast